Dadong may refer to:

China
 District
Dadong District, Shenyang, Liaoning

Subdistricts
Dadong Subdistrict, Guangzhou, in Yuexiu District, Guangzhou, Guangdong
Dadong Subdistrict, Jilin City, in Chuanying District, Jilin City, Jilin
Dadong Subdistrict, Donggang, Liaoning

Towns
Written as "":
Dadong, Dabu County, Guangdong
Dadong, Jiangsu, in Lianshui County

Written as "":
Dadong, Bobai County, Guangxi
Dadong, Qinzhou, in Qinbei District, Qinzhou, Guangxi

Townships
Dadong Township, in Gucheng District, Lijiang, Yunnan

Other
Da Dong Roast Duck Restaurant (often rendered as "DaDong"), main restaurant located in Dongcheng District, Beijing

South Korea
Da-dong ( / ), neighbourhood of the Jung-gu District in Seoul